Minister for Gender Equality may refer to:

 Minister for Gender Equality (Denmark)
 Minister of Equality (Spain)
 Minister for Gender Equality (Sweden)